Mumbai Falcons is an Indian motorsports team established by Ameet Harjinder Gadhoke, Navjeet Singh Gadhoke and Teja Ranade Gadhoke in November 2019. Moid Tungekar is the CEO of Mumbai Falcons. Its main headquarters is located in Pune, Maharashtra. The team originally debuted in the year 2019 as X1Racing at the Buddh International Circuit and the Madras Motor Race Track followed by the 2021 F3 Asian Championship held in the United Arab Emirates. It operates under a technical partnership with Italian team Prema Racing.

History
The team was founded in November 2019 by Gadhoke Group. They made their debut in November 2019 in the X1RL league with their 5 drivers Kush Maini, Mikkel Jensen, Pippa Mann, Karthik Tharani and Sohil Shah. They entered F3 Asian championship in 2021. The team became the first Indian team to compete  and finish in the top 3 in F3 Asian Championship with the drivers Kush Maini and Jehan Daruvala. The team had Armaan Ebrahim as team principal. It is also mentored by Kapil Dev. The team's cars were operated by Prema Powerteam.

On 20 February 2022, Mumbai Falcons secured a historic double victory in the Formula Regional Asian Championship held at UAE winning both the Driver and Teams Championship.

Current series results

F3 Asian Championship/Formula Regional Asian Championship

Formula Regional Middle East Championship

Formula 4 UAE Championship

Former series results

X1 Racing League

Timeline

Notes

References

External links
 
Indian auto racing teams
Formula Regional Indian Championship
F4 Indian Championship
Formula BMW teams
Auto racing teams established in 2019
Formula Regional teams